The following is a list of the restricted-range endemic bird species found in the Western Palearctic region:

 Algerian nuthatch
 Atlantic canary
 Balearic warbler
 Berthelot's pipit
 Blue chaffinch:
 Gran Canaria blue chaffinch endemic to Gran Canaria
 Tenerife blue chaffinch endemic to Tenerife
 Bolle's pigeon
 Cape Verde swamp warbler
 Caucasian black grouse
 Caucasian snowcock
 Corsican finch
 Corsican nuthatch
 Cyprus warbler
 Cyprus wheatear
 Fuerteventura chat
 Iago sparrow
 Krüper's nuthatch
 Laurel pigeon
 Madeira firecrest
 Plain swift
 Raso lark
 Scottish crossbill
 Spanish imperial eagle
 Tenerife goldcrest
 Trocaz pigeon

In addition the following species are endemic to the region:

 Northern bald ibis
 Rock partridge
 Red-legged partridge
 Barbary partridge
 Cory's shearwater
 Cape Verde shearwater
 European storm-petrel
 European shag
 Red kite
 Levant sparrowhawk
 Mediterranean gull
 White-eyed gull
 Audouin's gull
 Red-necked nightjar
 Middle spotted woodpecker
 Iberian green woodpecker
 European green woodpecker
 Levaillant's woodpecker
 Crested tit
 Sardinian warbler
 Dartford warbler
 Citril finch

The following are near-endemics

 Squacco heron

Lists of endemic birds by region